The IRL Men's World Rankings are the ranking system for men's national teams in the sport of rugby league football. The teams of the member nations of the International Rugby League, rugby league football's world governing body, are ranked based on their game results with the most successful teams being ranked highest. A point system is used, with points being awarded based on the results of IRL-recognized international matches. Under the existing system, rankings are based on a team's performance over the last three years, with more recent results and more significant matches being more heavily weighted to help reflect the current competitive state of a team.

Ranking system
The IRL World Rankings are calculated based on an average of points accumulated by each nation over a three-year cycle. Under the structure, matches deemed of higher importance such as World Cup games, Four Nations and other major tournament finals draw more points than mid-season Tests and other ‘Internationals’. For each match that a nation participates they are given a base level of points. This base level is affected upon the type of match (World Cup, Major Tournament, Test Match and International) and the status of the opponent.

Bonus points are given for teams that reach certain milestones deemed of significant international importance including reaching a tournament final or qualifying for an event such as a World Cup.

From the total number of points that a nation will receive these points are then averaged to help give a more accurate view of the performance of a nation over the three-year cycle.

Nations which have played fewer than 5 matches over a three-year cycle will be penalised under the current point structure.

Use of the rankings
The rankings are used by International Rugby League to view the progression and ability of the national rugby league teams.

The data is currently used in things as seeding for tournaments such as the European Cup, Oceania Cup MEA Championship, Americas Championship and the South American Championship and the World Cup.

Current calculation method

Match status
A weighting system has been implemented by the IRL to give more points to teams if they gain a victory over a major team in a major tournament, with friendlies ranked with considerably fewer points than any World Cup finals match or the final of Cups such as the European, Mediterranean and Pacific Cups.

Opponent strength
The IRL has organized the ranking so that a win against a very highly ranked opponent is a considerably greater achievement than a win against a low-rated opponent, so the strength of the opposing team is a factor.

Assessment period
All matches played over the last thirty-six months or three years are included in the calculation of the rankings, but there is a weighting system implemented to put more emphasis on recent results.

Historical rankings

Best and worst

See also

International Rugby League
RLIF Awards
IRL Wheelchair World Rankings

References 

Rugby league trophies and awards
Sports world rankings